is an association football-themed media franchise created by Level-5. The franchise began with the release of Inazuma Eleven in 2008, with the game series selling over 8 million copies worldwide by 2016. In addition to video games, the franchise also has a manga series and a number of other animated television series and films. Most of the games are not released in North America, despite being released in PAL territories; the only exception is a port of the original Inazuma Eleven on the Nintendo 3DS.

Video games

Main series
Inazuma Eleven (2008)
Inazuma Eleven 2 (2009)
Inazuma Eleven 3 (2010)
Inazuma Eleven: Victory Road (2023)

Inazuma Eleven GO
Inazuma Eleven GO (2011)
Inazuma Eleven GO 2: Chrono Stone (2012)
Inazuma Eleven GO: Galaxy (2013)

Spin-offs
Inazuma Eleven Strikers
Inazuma Eleven Strikers 2012 Xtreme
Inazuma Eleven GO Strikers 2013
Inazuma Eleven 1, 2, 3!! The Legend of Mamoru Endou (compilation)
Inazuma Eleven Everyday
Inazuma Eleven Online
Inazuma Eleven Dash
LINE Puzzle de Inazuma Eleven
Inazuma Eleven SD

Anime
A number of anime television series have been produced by Level-5, in conjunction with TV Tokyo and OLM.
Inazuma Eleven (TV series)
Inazuma Eleven (season 1)
Inazuma Eleven (season 2)
Inazuma Eleven (season 3)
Inazuma Eleven GO (TV series)
Inazuma Eleven GO (season 1)
Inazuma Eleven GO: Chrono Stone (TV series)
Inazuma Eleven GO: Galaxy (TV series)
Inazuma Eleven: Ares
Inazuma Eleven: Orion no Kokuin

Films
Inazuma Eleven: Saikyō Gundan Ōga Shūrai
Inazuma Eleven GO: Kyūkyoku no Kizuna Gurifon
Inazuma Eleven GO vs. Danbōru Senki W
Inazuma Eleven: Chō Jigen Dream Match

Manga
Inazuma Eleven (manga)
Inazuma Eleven GO (manga)
HonoSuto! ~Gouenji no Hitorigoto~

References

External links
Official site 

 
Level-5 (company) franchises
Mass media franchises introduced in 2008
Video games adapted into television shows
Video games adapted into films